Charmaine McMenamin (born 13 May 1990) is a New Zealand rugby union and rugby league player. She previously played for the Kiwi Ferns in 2010 before making her test debut for the Black Ferns in 2013. She was a member of the Black Ferns victorious 2017 and 2021 squads.

McMenamin plays for the Blues Women in the Super Rugby Aupiki competition.

Early life 
McMenamin was born in Wellington but was raised on the East Cape. She attended Gisborne Girls' High School. She affiliates with the Ngāti Porou iwi.

Rugby career

Rugby League 
McMenamin played Rugby League for New Zealand, debuting in 2010 against the touring England team. In February 2016, she played in the NRL Auckland Nines and in a Test Match against Australia.

Rugby Union 
In 2013, McMenamin made her international debut for the Black Ferns against England at Auckland. She was selected for the Black Ferns squad to the 2017 Rugby World Cup in Ireland.

McMenamin featured in two test matches against Australia in August 2018.

In June 2019, McMenamin was part of the winning team of the Super Series in San Diego. She next featured in two tests against the Wallaroos in August as the Black Ferns clean swept the series. She scored two first half tries in the first test as New Zealand won 47–10. She then scored again in the second test to help the Black Ferns win 37–8 and retain the Laurie O'Reilly Cup.

In December 2019, She was awarded the International Women's Player of the Year by the New Zealand Rugby Players Association.

McMenamin was named as Vice-captain of the Possibles team in a Black Ferns trial match in November. She turned out for the Black Ferns a week later in two games against the New Zealand Barbarians.

McMenamin played for the Blues against the Chiefs in the first-ever women's Super Rugby match in New Zealand on 1 May 2021. She later discovered that she had bone spurs on her spinal cord that required surgery. She has since recovered after a spinal fusion in October.

In July 2022, McMenamin played for the Ngalingali team in a Black Ferns trial match. She made her return to the Black Ferns as she was selected in the squad for the Laurie O’Reilly Cup Test series against Australia in August.

McMenamin made the Black Ferns 32-player squad for the 2021 Rugby World Cup.

References

External links 
 Charmaine McMenamin at Black Ferns

1990 births
Living people
New Zealand women's international rugby union players
New Zealand female rugby league players
New Zealand national rugby league team players
New Zealand female rugby union players
Rugby union players from Wellington City
Rugby league players from Wellington City
Ngāti Porou people